Hope For Men is the second studio album by Pissed Jeans. The lyrics of many of the songs are about very mundane subjects, such as eating ice cream and scrapbooking, in sharp contrast to the frenzied vocals and loud, off-key instrumentals. The tracks "Scrapbooking" and "The Jogger" are essentially spoken-word tracks, the latter with a crashing guitar backdrop.

Track listing
 People Person – 4:58
 Secret Admirer – 3:27
 A Bad Wind – 3:06
 Scrapbooking – 5:13
 I've Still Got You (Ice Cream) – 3:07
 Fantasy World – 3:38
 I'm Turning Now – 3:20
 Caught Licking Leather – 3:58
 The Jogger – 3:10
 My Bed – 7:42

References

2007 albums
Pissed Jeans albums
Sub Pop albums